Herefords is a town in northern Eswatini. It is located between the towns of Ngonini and Bholekane.

References
Fitzpatrick, M., Blond, B., Pitcher, G., Richmond, S., and Warren, M. (2004)  South Africa, Lesotho and Swaziland. Footscray, VIC: Lonely Planet.

Populated places in Eswatini